Kakavand District is a district (bakhsh) in Delfan County, Lorestan Province, Iran. At the 2006 census, its population was 23,598, in 4,574 families.  Kakavand District has one city Haft Cheshmeh, Delfan. The District is subdivided into four Rural Districts: Kakavand-e Sharqi Rural District, Kakavand-e Gharbi Rural District, Itivand-e Jonubi Rural District, and Itivand-e Shomali Rural District.

References 

Districts of Lorestan Province
Delfan County